Dmitry Walerjewicz Khomitsevich is a Russian seven times ice speedway world champion.   

Khomitsevich won the Individual Ice Speedway World Championship title in 2016 and the Team Ice Racing World Championship nine times with Russia, in 2010, 2011, 2012, 2015, 2016, 2017, 2018, 2019 and 2020.

His older brother is another multiple world champion Vitaly Khomitsevich.

References

1985 births
Living people
Russian speedway riders
Ice Speedway World Champions
People from Kamensk-Uralsky
Sportspeople from Sverdlovsk Oblast